Taha Muhammad Ali (1931 in Saffuriyya, Galilee – October 2, 2011 in Nazareth) was a Palestinian poet.

Biography
Taha Muhammad Ali fled to Lebanon with his family when he was seventeen after their village came under heavy bombardment during the 1948 Arab-Israeli War. The following year, he returned to Nazareth, where he lived till his death. In the 1950s and 1960s, he sold souvenirs during the day to Christian pilgrims and studied poetry at night. His formal education ended after fourth grade. He was owner of a small souvenir shop near the Church of the Annunciation which he operated with his sons, Muhammad Ali wrote vividly of his childhood in Saffuriyya and the political upheavals he survived.

Publications
A collection of his work in English translation (with facing Arabic), So What: New & Selected Poems, 1971–2005, translated by Peter Cole, Yahya Hijazi, and Gabriel Levin, was published by Copper Canyon Press in 2006. A British edition of the same book appeared with Bloodaxe Books. German and French translations are underway. He has given numerous readings with Cole in the US and Europe.
Muhammad Ali is the subject of a biography published by Yale University Press, My Happiness Bears No Relation to Happiness: A Poet's Life in the Palestinian Century by Adina Hoffman.
The Palestinian-Israeli novelist Anton Shammas has translated a collection of Taha Muhammad Ali's work into Hebrew.

Poetic style
Muhammad Ali's style has been described in the introduction to his English collection as "forceful" and written "in short lines of varying beats with a minimum of fuss and a rich array of images drawn primarily from his village life."

In a review of So What: New & Selected Poems, he is described as a "beguiling story-teller who maintains a tone of credibility and lucidity without diluting the mysterious or distressing aspects of his tale...By avoiding commonplace response to everyday experience he has written poems that are fragile and graceful and fresh."

Other
Amer Hlehel wrote and performs a monodrama, “Taha”, commemorating Taha Muhammad Ali's life and poetry, and particularly the latter's experience of the nakba. The English-language premiere was performed  on the 16 of March 2017  at the Kennedy Center for the Performing Arts in Washington DC.

Published work

Anthologies

See also
Autodidacticism

References

External links
 Interview with Muhammad Ali, The NewsHour with Jim Lehrer,  
 Book Description 
 Review of So What: New & Selected Poems, 1971–2005 
 Biography from the international literature festival berlin
 Review from The Nation http://www.thenation.com/doc/20070219/palattella
 Blue Flower Arts page http://www.blueflowerarts.com/tmuhammad.html

Palestinian poets
Israeli Arabic-language poets
1931 births
2011 deaths
20th-century poets